Norman Davis (born August 8, 1945, Cocoa, Florida) is an American football former guard in the National Football League. He played college football for the Grambling State Tigers. Davis was drafted by the Baltimore Colts in the 3rd round (54th overall selection) in 1967. He played one season each for the Baltimore Colts (1967), the New Orleans Saints (1969), and the Philadelphia Eagles (1970).

References

1945 births
Living people
People from Cocoa, Florida
Players of American football from Florida
American football offensive guards
Grambling State Tigers football players
Baltimore Colts players
Philadelphia Eagles players
New Orleans Saints players